Troitskoye is a rural locality (a selo) and the administrative center of Nanaysky District, Khabarovsk Krai, Russia. Population:

References

Notes

Sources

Rural localities in Khabarovsk Krai